Rhoadesville is an unincorporated community in Orange County, Virginia, United States. Rhoadesville has a post office with ZIP code 22542.

References

Unincorporated communities in Orange County, Virginia
Unincorporated communities in Virginia